Sokolniki is a station on the Bolshaya Koltsevaya line of the Moscow Metro. A transfer to Sokolniki is planned. It was opened on 1 March 2023.

Gallery

References

Moscow Metro stations
Bolshaya Koltsevaya line